Arhopala eridanus is a butterfly in the family Lycaenidae. It was described by Cajetan Felder in 1860. It is  found in the Indomalayan realm.

Subspecies
A. e. eridanus (Ambon, Serang)
A. e. elfeta  (Hewitson, 1869) (Sula Island, Banggai)
A. e. dilutior  (Staudinger, 1889) (Palawan)
A. e. lewara Ribbe, 1926 (Sulawesi)
A. e. padus C. & R. Felder, [1865] (Halmahera)
A. e. davalma Schröder & Treadaway, 2006 (Philippines)

References

External links
Arhopala Boisduval, 1832 at Markku Savela's Lepidoptera and Some Other Life Forms

Arhopala
Butterflies described in 1860
Butterflies of Asia
Taxa named by Baron Cajetan von Felder